Stuff You Should Know, often abbreviated as SYSK, is a podcast and video series published by iHeartRadio and hosted by Josh Clark and Charles W. "Chuck" Bryant. The podcast, which releases episodes several times a week, educates listeners on a wide variety of topics, often using popular culture as a reference, giving the podcast comedic value.  

Since debuting in 2008, the podcast is consistently ranked in the Top 10 on iTunes and is one of the most popular podcasts in the world, being downloaded millions of times each month. On October 3, 2018, the podcast started releasing additional short episodes titled Short Stuff, where they cover topics that don't warrant the length of a full episode. A number of other types of media, including a TV show and books, have been spun off by the podcast.

Josh & Chuck
Stuff You Should Know is hosted by two podcasters who first met while working as senior editors at HowStuffWorks.com, Josh Clark and Charles Wayne "Chuck" Bryant. 

Clark was a host of the show since the beginning, and before Bryant took over the co-hosting duties Clark was joined by several other editors. The chemistry between the two was immediately apparent, and Bryant became a permanent co-host.  Bryant started working at HowStuffWorks about a month after Clark. They had desks kitty-corner across from each other and would often pop up to share their research. They became good friends within a week.

Josh M. Clark
Josh Malcolm Clark was born July 15, 1976. He grew up in Toledo, Ohio and was raised Catholic, attending a Catholic school. He studied at the University of Georgia, but left with six classes left to start a newspaper.

He moved to Marietta, Georgia as a teenager. Clark's father's name is Mal, an HVAC engineer. He had a sister named Karen, who died in 1992 in a car accident when Josh was 16 years old, and two brothers-in-law, one of whom is also named Josh. In 2010 Clark lived with his then-girlfriend Umi (who is six months younger than him) in midtown Atlanta; he proposed on August 13, 2011 and the couple has since married. The couple parents a small dog named Momo.

He is a former smoker, drinks a lot of coffee, and is an amateur mixologist. His hero is Muhammad Yunus.  His favorite books include 1491 and 1493 by Charles C. Mann which he frequently quotes and/or references in the SYSK podcast. Josh is also a fan of The Simpsons, Firefly, Dollywood, Quentin Tarantino and shares an affinity with his cohost Bryant for the band Pavement.

He attended Sprayberry High School and studied history and anthropology at the University of Georgia. As a youth interested in the paranormal, he wanted to study parapsychology at Duke University. Also as a child, he was an avid reader of Uncle John's Bathroom Reader, as mentioned in many podcasts, and he jokingly cites Uncle John's Bathroom Reader as the source of the majority of his knowledge. This admiration was eventually reciprocated when UJBR mentioned SYSK on their website and had one of their employees feature as a guest on SYSK's Barbie doll podcast.

After college he pursued a career in journalism, working as "a cub reporter" in Henry County, Georgia, and was the founding editor of The Washboard Weekly, an "edgy tabloid" in Johnson City, Tennessee. It went out of business due to a lack of advertising. In 2022, Clark was featured as the voice actor of Wiggly Worm 2 in one episode of Bee and PuppyCat, a streaming television series.

Before joining HowStuffWorks in 2007 he was a self described factotum who held many jobs. He had a paper route, washed dogs, and held "jobs that involved shovels." Before recording his first episode in 2008, Clark had never listened to a podcast, and didn't know what one was.

Charles W. "Chuck" Bryant
Charles Wayne Bryant is always introduced on the show as Charles W. "Chuck" Bryant, but fans often refer to him as "Chuckers." Born March 15, 1971, Bryant was raised Baptist and played church league sports, although his "constant struggle with [his] religious upbringing" has been "well documented over the years."

Bryant grew up in DeKalb County, Georgia but his family lived in "rural Mississippi since the dawn of time," as well as Tennessee. Chuck is also part Choctaw Indian. He attended Redan elementary school where his father was the principal and graduated from Redan High School. He earned a bachelor's degree from the University of Georgia with a major in English. His mother, Dianne, was also a teacher. He has a brother named Scott who is three years older. His sister Michelle, who is six years older, is married to Karsten S. Heckl, a Marine Corps General. His uncle, Ed Bryant, is a former Republican member of the U.S. House of Representatives from Tennessee. Bryant once appeared on the cover of Guideposts magazine.

Bryant attended the University of Georgia where he studied English. After college, he took classes in screenwriting at New York University's film school and then moved to Los Angeles for four years. He has also lived in New Jersey.

Bryant is married to Emilie Sennebogen, and in 2015 the couple adopted a daughter, Ruby Rose, who shares a birthday with Clark.  As a self-described "crazy animal person," he has multiple pets. He plays the guitar in an "old man band," called "El Cheapo." Humorist John Hodgman is a "dear friend."

He is the author of six screenplays, including one about a Southern Baptist church called "Sweet, Sweet Spirit," but did not find success in that field. While in Los Angeles, he was a production assistant on TV commercials, a few indie movies, and music videos, which he says helped with the TV version of Stuff You Should Know. He was hired at HowStuffWorks after a friend got a job there, and submitted the first act of a screenplay as a writing sample.

Podcast

History
The podcast was launched on April 17, 2008, with Clark as the solo host. Bryant made his debut a month later on May 13, 2008. Bryant became the permanent cohost on July 15, 2008. The podcast, which was named by Clark, began as an attempt to re-purpose some of the written content on HowStuffWorks.com. Clark had never listened to a podcast before he recorded his first episode in 2008. Jesse Thorn has held the name up as a model of how a podcast should be named saying "it's like daring the listener not to listen to it."

The podcast has steadily grown in popularity since its introduction and has made appearances at events including South by Southwest and Comic-Con. On October 26, 2017, Stuff You Should Know released their 1000th episode. Several episodes have been recorded during live events, including two during their World Tour of Canada in September and October 2014. While in Canada they also participated in the Northwest Podcast Festival, at SXSW in 2011 and 2012, and New York Comic Con in 2012 where they recorded their discussion entitled "Time Travel: Science Fact or Science Fiction?"

During the 4th of July weekend in 2011, there was a Stuff You Should Know About America marathon on Sirius XM radio. It featured previous episodes, as well as a live segment with Wyatt Cenac and Hallie Haglund of The Daily Show as well as Joe Randazzo, Joe Garden and Jill Morris of The Onion. Their 420th episode was on medical marijuana, although this was reportedly a coincidence.

In 2011, the podcast added "Bonus Videos" to the podcast feed. These consist of humorous 60 second videos where Clark and Bryant converse about subjects they covered on previous podcasts while doing a variety of random activities (playing checkers, getting fitted for a suit, going to a doctor, driving through a car wash). As they speak, the scene changes repeatedly to something completely different, though their conversation continues uninterrupted as though nothing had happened. These clips have also aired during commercial slots on Science and appear on their YouTube channel.

There is one unaired episode on animal detectives that they hope will never be published. They have repeated a topic three times. They revisited the topic of Murphy's Law in 2011 after first doing it in 2008. As one of their first episodes, it was under 6 minutes in length. They also accidentally repeated a podcast on customs. The first time was in 2010 and the second was in 2016. In July 2018, they released an episode on recycling as an update on their first one, recorded over a decade ago.

On November 7, 2018, Josh Clark created a podcast called The End Of The World with Josh Clark, a 10-episode series that discusses what dangers lie in humanity's future. , their office and studio was in the Ponce City Market in Atlanta. and their studio is slightly larger than a broom closet and features "kooky" items listeners have sent in, including wedding invitations and photoshopped movie posters with Clark and Bryant's faces on them. The office has a large mural depicting the formation of an idea, a research library, and giant question mark-shaped conference table.

Format
The podcast, which was the second on HowStuffWorks, has been described as the "heart and soul of the operation," with the "well researched" episodes cover a variety topics from the fields of "science, history, urban legends, and pop culture, with the occasional conspiracy theory thrown in for good measure." Clark and Bryant have a conversation about the given topic such that, by the end, listeners have a "basic working knowledge of that subject." Clark has said they are on a "never ending quest to explain absolutely everything there is on planet earth and beyond."

Their "biggest hits" include episodes on Spam, hangovers, tipping in restaurants, cheese, Barbie, and pinball. The topics that get the greatest response from listeners include death and grieving, and episodes that received "less enthusiastic feedback" include shows on homelessness/addiction, Tourette's Syndrome, and transgender issues. Episodes are normally around 45 minutes in length, although for more in-depth topics the show occasionally runs long as an hour or more. Initial episodes were much shorter in duration, often less than 10 minutes.

One of the reasons the hosts believe the show has been so successful is that they are "definitely not experts" in the myriad subjects they explore, but are instead "just guys who enjoy research and [are] very curious." Their formula "is part self-deprecating humour, part infectious wonder and part self-discipline to go their separate ways and do all their own research and reflection before they get to the studio." They often try to surprise one another with their research, and do not have a script or a time limit before they sit down to record. Likewise, they do not rehearse beforehand.

Most episodes end with listener mail, although there is an occasional segment known as "Administrative Details." Listener mail debuted on November 25, 2008, in the episode named "How Albert Einstein's Brain Worked". On that episode, they called it "Correction Time." The first time it was known as "Listener Mail" was on January 8, 2009, an episode that was inspired by a listener's email. During the Listener Mail portion of the podcast on April 11, 2013, a new jingle for the show was introduced. It was written and recorded by Rusty Matyas of Winnipeg, Manitoba in Canada, a musician and fan. Jon Biegen, another fan who covered Matyas' band, The Sheepdogs, has produced several new jingles for the show.

The show's regular producer is Jeri "Jerome" Rowland, and she is assisted by a variety of regular guest producers, including Matt and Noel.  Other staff includes Rebecca, the web producer, as well as Sherry and Joe. In 2017, there was a staff of 35.

YouTube
Stuff You Should Know also has a YouTube channel, but stopped updating it regularly in 2017. Animated shorts are released on Mondays, This Day in History videos are released on Tuesdays, and Clark's series Don't Be Dumb airs a new episode on Thursdays. In addition, the pair also offers live shorts and movie reviews.

In "Don't Be Dumb," Clark explains a topic while wearing a tweed jacket and bow tie. His posture, gestures, and stilted language are intentionally uncomfortable and awkward. Each episode ends with Clark saying: "So, next time someone tells you [subject of video], you set them straight! And tell them Josh sent you."

Internet Roundup is a new video segment filmed in the studio. Chuck and Josh highlight a couple of posts found deep in the web that they find interesting, entreating or amusing. In 2009, Clark and Bryant began a "short lived" webcast.

TV show
A full-length Stuff You Should Know TV show premiered on January 19, 2013 on the Science Channel, which was owned by Discovery Network, the then-parent company of HowStuffWorks. The show included a pilot and 10 episodes each 30 minutes in length. The series was produced by production company School of Humans.

Described as the "love child of the British version of The Office and an overheard conversation about science between two reasonably informed guys," the show was about a real podcast that is set in a fictional world. Each episode followed Josh and Chuck inside and outside the recording booth, combining the factual information of their podcast with humorous, fictional story lines that align with each podcast topic.

The show had "the attention span of a teenaged boy" and "bounces from scene to scene without explanation or sense." Focus groups at the 2012 South by Southwest screened episodes and provided feedback for the development of the show, and its pacing in particular.

The lead actress on the show was Caitlin Bitzegaio of the Upright Citizens Brigade Theatre. The shows were directed by L.C. Crowley with a theme song and score composed by The Henry Clay People, the "unofficial house band" of Stuff You Should Know. Guests on the show included John Hodgman, Sarah Silverman, Neil deGrasse Tyson, Rufus Wainwright, and Michio Kaku.

The show was canceled after the first season "due to poor ratings", although each episode is made available for purchase on iTunes and Google Play. It was the most expensive pilot episode ever produced by the Discovery Channel.

Outside activities
As with the other podcasts offered by HowStuffWorks, Stuff You Should Know has its own blog updated daily by its hosts and often featuring the same type of material found in the podcasts, often with show follow-ups. There is also both a Twitter account and Facebook page for SYSK. Clark and Bryant were the co-hosts for the Science of Cyborgs event hosted by the Science & Entertainment Exchange.

Microlending
Starting in 2009, after doing an episode on how microlending works, the show began encouraging listeners to make loans on the online microlending site Kiva. A Stuff You Should Know team had raised $150,000 by the middle of 2010, and more than $2.75 million by November 2014. In 2009 they challenged Stephen Colbert to see whose team could raise $100,000 first and they "beat the pants off of" him, reaching that goal in three months.

The lending team is now run by fan volunteers, has since consistently ranked among the top five teams in terms of both donations and users.  the team ranked #7 for new users among new Kiva users, and in the "Friends" category of teams, ranked #2 for new users and amount loaned.

Books
Clark and Bryant also present two longer and more in-depth audio programs featuring interviews and portions recorded on location available for purchase as audiobooks, which are entitled The Super Stuffed Guide to the Economy and The Super Stuffed Guide to Happiness.

The two podcast hosts have also written a book with Nils Parker entitled Stuff You Should Know: An Incomplete Compendium of Mostly Interesting Things.  The book was published in November 2020 and covers a wide-range of topics including; history, psychology, pop culture, and science.

Cooperative for Education
In February 2010, Clark, Bryant, and Rowland traveled to Guatemala to promote Cooperative for Education, an organization which gives textbooks to schools in Guatemala to be rented by students for a small fee that is then deposited into an account that will be used to replace old textbooks in the future. They produced a pair of podcasts on the topic.

Trivial Pursuit 
On July 7, 2021, Hasbro released a special edition of Trivial Pursuit: The Stuff You Should Know Edition. The game is based on episodes from the podcast and contains categories of History, Pop Culture, Myths, Legends, & Conspiracies, Science & Tech, Humans, and SYSK Selects. These topics were chosen by hosts Josh and Chuck. Designed for 3 to 6 players, ages 16 and older, the game includes 600 questions with answers from various SYSK episodes. The game offers those stuck on questions various lifeline help such as "Stuff You Should Skip". The first player gaining each one of the 6 category tokens wins.

Reception
The show is downloaded more than 1 million times per week and is consistently on the iTunes Top 10 podcast rankings, peaking at #1. It is "one of the most downloaded podcasts on the planet." The show won the 2014 People's Voice Webby Award in the Mobile – Podcast division. and a place in Podcast Awards's Education category. At live events the demographics of the audiences are "all over the map. There are some geeks here and there, but also super cool people, and families and kids, and old people."

Entertainment Weekly chose the TV show in early February 2013 as #7 for their "The Must List: The Top 10 Things We Love This Week," writing, "Whether you're curious about bee colonies or weather control, Josh Clark and Chuck Bryant have the scoop." The podcast has been said to cover "a truly staggering range of topics."

Clark and Bryant have been described as "hosts so lovely you may just fall in love with them," and provide the show with "an everyman, conversational feel to the show — two pals sitting back and picking apart one topic after another." Several couples have been brought together because of their mutual fondness for the podcast, and one even had a Stuff You Should Know-themed wedding.

They receive over 350 pieces of fan mail a week. After two months, their Facebook page had over 10,000 likes, and as of September 2015 it had more than 750,000. One reviewer said of it: "It is never not fun to listen to."

Stuff You Should Knows "beautifully, beautifully done" production has set "the audio standard," according to podcast reviewers Pod on Pod. They added that the audio quality "could not be improved" on the NPR-level production.

The podcast won the 2016 Webby Award for "People's Voice". The podcast was the "People's Voice Winner" at the 2017 Webby Awards as well as an Honoree for "Best Host".

Awards

References

External links
 Official website
 SYSK blog
 Link to iTunes listing
 
 Official YouTube channel
 SYSK Kiva team
 Stuff You Should Know: The TV Show

2008 podcast debuts
Audio podcasts
Educational podcasts
Technology podcasts